During the 1992–93 English football season, Tottenham Hotspur F.C. competed in the inaugural season of the FA Premier League.

Season summary
The 1992–93 season saw Peter Shreeves sacked as head coach and replaced by joint head coaches Doug Livermore and Ray Clemence. Spurs became founder members of the new Premier League, created by the Football Association as a replacement for the Football League First Division as the highest division of English football. To coincide with the massive changes in English Football, Tottenham made a number of major signings. They paid a club record £2.1million for Nottingham Forest striker Teddy Sheringham, £750,000 for Southampton defender Neil Ruddock and £1.75million for Portsmouth's highly rated 19-year-old winger Darren Anderton. In the first ever Premier League season, Spurs finished eighth, with Teddy Sheringham being the division's top scorer with 22 goals, 21 for Tottenham Hotspur and 1 for Nottingham Forest, and also reached the FA Cup semi-final, losing 1–0 to Arsenal.

Final league table

Results
Tottenham Hotspur's score comes first

Legend

FA Premier League

FA Cup

League Cup

First-team squad

Transfers

In

Out

Loan Out

Statistics

Appearances and goals

{| class="wikitable" style="text-align:center"
|-
! rowspan="2" style="vertical-align:bottom;" | Pos.
! rowspan="2" style="vertical-align:bottom; width:240px" | Name
! colspan="2" style="width:85px;" | Premier League
! colspan="2" style="width:85px;" | FA Cup
! colspan="2" style="width:85px;" | EFL Cup
! colspan="2" style="width:85px;" | Total
|-
! Apps
! Goals
! Apps
! Goals
! Apps
! Goals
! Apps
! Goals
|-
| MF
| align="left" |  Paul Allen
|| 38 || 3 || 5 || 0 || 4 || 0 || 47 || 3
|-
| MF
| align="left" |  Darren Anderton
|| 32+2 || 6 || 4+1 || 1 || 2 || 1 || 38+3 || 8
|-
| DF
| align="left" |  Dean Austin
|| 33+1 || 0 || 5 || 0 || 2+1 || 0 || 40+2 || 0
|-
| MF
| align="left" |  Nick Barmby
|| 17+5 || 6 || 3+1 || 3 || 2+1 || 0 || 22+7 || 9
|-
| DF
| align="left" |  Guðni Bergsson
|| 0+5 || 0 || 0+1 || 0 || 0 || 0 || 0+6 || 0
|-
| DF
| align="left" |  Sol Campbell
|| 0+1 || 1 || 0 || 0 || 0 || 0 || 0+1 || 1
|-
| DF
| align="left" |  Jason Cundy
|| 13+2 || 1 || 0 || 0 || 2 || 0 || 15+2 || 1
|-
| GK
| align="left" |  Kevin Dearden
|| 0+1 || 0 || 0 || 0 || 0 || 0 || 0+1 || 0
|-
| FW
| align="left" |  Gordon Durie
|| 17 || 3 || 1 || 0 || 2 || 1 || 20 || 4
|-
| DF
| align="left" |  Justin Edinburgh
|| 31+1 || 0 || 5 || 0 || 3+1 || 0 || 39+2 || 0
|-
| DF
| align="left" |  Terry Fenwick
|| 3+2 || 0 || 0 || 0 || 0 || 0 || 3+2 || 0
|-
| MF
| align="left" |  Andy Gray
|| 9+8 || 1 || 0 || 0 || 0 || 0 || 9+8 || 1
|-
| FW
| align="left" |  John Hendry
|| 2+3 || 2 || 0 || 0 || 0 || 0 || 2+3 || 2
|-
| MF
| align="left" |  Danny Hill
|| 2+2 || 0 || 0 || 0 || 0 || 0 || 2+2 || 0
|-
| DF
| align="left" |  Lee Hodges
|| 0+4 || 0 || 0 || 0 || 0 || 0 || 0+4 || 0
|-
| MF
| align="left" |  David Howells
|| 16+2 || 1 || 2+1 || 0 || 0+1 || 0 || 18+4 || 1
|-
| DF
| align="left" |  Gary Mabbutt
|| 29 || 2 || 5 || 0 || 2 || 0 || 36 || 2
|-
| DF
| align="left" |  David McDonald
|| 2 || 0 || 0 || 0 || 0 || 0 || 2 || 0
|-
| MF
| align="left" |  Jeff Minton
|| 0 || 0 || 0 || 0 || 0+1 || 0 || 0+1 || 0
|-
| FW
| align="left" |  Paul Moran
|| 0+3 || 0 || 0 || 0 || 0 || 0 || 0+3 || 0
|-
| MF
| align="left" |  Nayim
|| 15+3 || 3 || 3 || 3 || 2 || 0 || 20+3 || 6
|-
| DF
| align="left" |  Stuart Nethercott
|| 3+2 || 0 || 0 || 0 || 0 || 0 || 3+2 || 0
|-
| DF
| align="left" |  Neil Ruddock
|| 38 || 3 || 5 || 0 || 4 || 0 || 47 || 3
|-
| MF
| align="left" |  Vinny Samways
|| 34 || 0 || 5 || 2 || 3 || 1 || 42 || 3
|-
| MF
| align="left" |  Steve Sedgley
|| 20+2 || 3 || 2 || 1 || 3 || 0 || 25+2 || 4
|-
| FW
| align="left" |  Teddy Sheringham
|| 38 || 21 || 5 || 4 || 4 || 3 || 47 || 28
|-
| GK
| align="left" |  Erik Thorstvedt
|| 25+2 || 0 || 5 || 0 || 2 || 0 || 32+2 || 0
|-
| MF
| align="left" |  Andy Turner
|| 7+11 || 3 || 0+1 || 0 || 0+2 || 1 || 7+14 || 4
|-
| DF
| align="left" |  Dave Tuttle
|| 4+1 || 0 || 0 || 0 || 2 || 0 || 6+1 || 0
|-
| DF
| align="left" |  Pat Van Den Hauwe
|| 13+5 || 0 || 0 || 0 || 2 || 0 || 15+5 || 0
|-
| GK
| align="left" |  Ian Walker
|| 17 || 0 || 0 || 0 || 2 || 0 || 19 || 0
|-
| MF
| align="left" |  Kevin Watson
|| 4+1 || 0 || 0+1 || 0 || 1+1 || 1 || 5+3 || 1
|-

Goal scorers

Clean sheets

References

Tottenham Hotspur F.C. seasons
Tottenham Hotspur